Doreen Ryan (born 27 September 1931) is a Canadian speed skater. She competed at the 1960 Winter Olympics and the 1964 Winter Olympics. In-between the Olympics she had three children in December 1962.

References

External links
 

1931 births
Living people
Canadian female speed skaters
Olympic speed skaters of Canada
Speed skaters at the 1960 Winter Olympics
Speed skaters at the 1964 Winter Olympics
Speed skaters from Edmonton
20th-century Canadian women